Leonid Vladimirovitch Pozen (1849–1921) was a Russo-Ukrainian  sculptor and politician. Most of his works were made using wax and then cast in bronze at the K. Werfel factory in St Petersburg. His early works show his attraction to animal sculpture. His realism placed Pozen alongside the painters Vasily Perov, Grigory Myasoyedov, and Ivan Kramskoy.

References

Russian Bronzes by Leonid Posen-Pozen-Posene

19th-century Ukrainian painters
19th-century Ukrainian male artists
19th-century male artists from the Russian Empire
Ukrainian male painters
Ukrainian sculptors
Ukrainian male sculptors
20th-century Ukrainian painters
20th-century Ukrainian male artists
20th-century Russian male artists
19th-century painters from the Russian Empire
Russian male painters
20th-century Russian painters
1849 births
1921 deaths
People from Poltava Oblast